The knockout stages of the 2012 Copa Santander Libertadores de América consisted of four stages:
Round of 16 (first legs: April 25, May 1–3; second legs: May 8–10)
Quarterfinals (first legs: May 16–17; second legs: May 23–24)
Semifinals (first legs: June 13–14; second legs: June 20–21)
Finals (first leg: June 27; second leg: July 4)

Format
The group winners and runners-up of the second stage qualified for the knockout stages. The sixteen teams played a single-elimination tournament. In each stage, teams played in two-legged ties on a home-away basis, with the higher-seeded team playing the second leg at home. Each team earned 3 points for a win, 1 point for a draw, and 0 points for a loss. The following criteria were used for breaking ties on points, except for the final:
Goal difference
Away goals
Penalty shootout (no extra time is played)
For the final, the first tiebreaker was goal difference. If tied on goal difference, the away goals rule would not be applied, and 30 minutes of extra time would be played. If still tied after extra time, the title would be decided by penalty shootout.

If two teams from the same association reached the semifinals, they would be forced to play each other.

Qualified teams

Seeding
The 16 qualified teams are seeded in the knockout stages according to their results in the second stage, with the group winners seeded 1–8, and the group runners-up seeded 9–16. The teams were ranked by: 1. Points (Pts); 2. Goal difference (GD); 3. Goals scored (GF); 4. Away goals (AG); 5. Drawing of lots.

Bracket
In each tie, the higher-seeded team played the second leg at home.

Round of 16
Team 1 played the second leg at home.

Match A

Fluminense won on points 4–1.

Match B

Corinthians won on points 4–1.

Match C

Tied on points 3–3, Santos won on goal difference.

Match D

Tied on points 3–3, Universidad de Chile won on goal difference.

Match E

Libertad won on points 4–1.

Match F

Vélez Sársfield won on points 4–1.

Match G

Tied on points 3–3, Vasco da Gama won on penalties.

Match H

Boca Juniors won on points 6–0.

Quarterfinals
Team 1 played the second leg at home.

Match S1

Boca Juniors won on points 4–1.

Match S2

Corinthians won on points 4–1.

Match S3

Tied on points 3–3, Santos won on penalties.

Match S4

Tied on points 2–2, Universidad de Chile won on penalties.

Semifinals
Team 1 played the second leg at home.

Match F1

Boca Juniors won on points 4–1.

Match F2

Corinthians won on points 4–1.

Finals

The Finals were played over two legs, with the higher-seeded team playing the second leg at home. If the teams were tied on points and goal difference at the end of regulation in the second leg, the away goals rule would not be applied and 30 minutes of extra time would be played. If still tied after extra time, the title would be decided by penalty shootout.

Corinthians won on points 4–1.

References

External links
Official webpage  

Knockout stages